The Constantinian Excerpts was a 53-volume Greek anthology of excerpts from at least 25 historians. It was commissioned by the Byzantine emperor Constantine VII (945–959), but probably not completed until after his death. Today only two volumes survive complete plus fragments of three others. The titles of 21 other volumes are known. The volumes are typically known by their Latin titles. The title of the whole, Excerpts, is also conventional.

The original work may not have been truly a selection of excerpts so much as an anthology of whole texts rearranged thematically. According to the preface, the project involved taking the works of selected historians and rearranging their passages by topic rather than chronology so that "nothing contained in the texts would escape this distribution into subjects; by this division according to the content nothing of the continuous narration is omitted, but rather it is preserved entire." Nonetheless, there is evidence of abridgement. There is also commentary.

The earliest historian included in the Excerpts is Herodotus (5th century BC) and the latest George Hamartolos (9th century AD). There is some material preserved in the surviving Excerpts that is not preserved anywhere else, including selections from Polybius, Nicolaus of Damascus, Dexippus, Eunapius, Priscus, Peter the Patrician, Menander Protector and John of Antioch. Other historians included were Thucydides, Xenophon, Diodorus of Sicily, Dionysius of Halicarnassus, Josephus, Arrian of Nicomedia, Iamblichus, Appian of Alexandria, Cassius Dio, Socrates of Constantinople, Theodoret of Cyrrhus, Sozomen, Philostorgius, Zosimus, Procopius, Agathias of Myrina, Theophylact Simocatta, John Malalas and Malchus of Philadelphia. The ordering of authors within volumes follows no obvious rationale. An author's excerpts within a volume, however, are never presented out of order.

Only four volumes of the original 53 survive either in whole or in part. The complete surviving volume is the Excerpta de legationibus, which is divided into two parts: Excerpta de legationibus gentium ad Romanos (On embassies to Rome) and the Excerpta de legationibus Romanorum ad gentes (On embassies from Rome). The original volume, kept in the Escorial, was lost to fire in 1671, but not before several copies had been made. Also kept in the Escorial (shelfmark Ω.I.11) is a 16th-century copy of Excerpta de insidiis (On ambushes), with another 16th-century copy in the Bibliothèque nationale de France (Graecus 1666). Two more original volumes survive in part: the Excerpta de virtutibus et vitiis (On virtues and vices) in the Codex Peirescianus and the Excerpta de sententiis (On gnomic statements) as a palimpsest in the Vatican Library (Graecus 73). Fulvio Orsini prepared the first edition of the Excerpta, printed at Antwerp in 1582.

The purpose of the Excerpts was as a sort of mirror for princes. Since history was believed to contain useful lessons for rulers, it was considered advantageous to arrange history thematically so that, in the words of Leonora Neville, "if an emperor was concerned with an upcoming embassy, he could read all the examples of embassies in Roman history at one time." The compilers of the Suda made use of the Excerpts more often than the original works.


Notes

Editions
Excerpta Historica iussu imperatoris Constantini Porphyrogeniti Confecta, ed. Ursul Boissevain, Carl de Boor, Theodor Büttner-Wobst, and Anton Roos, 4 vols. Berlin: Weidmann, 1903–1910.

References

Bibliography

 

Constantine VII
Byzantine literature
10th century in the Byzantine Empire
10th-century books